Agria is a genus of true flies in the family Sarcophagidae.

Species
A. affinis (Fallén, 1817)
A. cicadina (Kato, 1943)
A. hikosana (Kurahashi, 1975)
A. housei Shewell, 1971
A. mamillata Pandellé, 1896
A. monachae (Kramer, 1908)
A. shinonagai (Kurahashi, 1975)
A. xiangchengensis Chao & Zhang, 1988

References 

Sarcophagidae
Schizophora genera